Selim Haroun Nzé (born February 4, 1993) is an Algerian-Gabonese football player who plays for Vila Flor SC in Portugal.

Early life
Selim was born on February 4, 1993, in Boulogne-Billancourt to an Algerian father and a Gabonese mother.

International career
On January 31, 2012, Haroun was called up for the first time to the Algerian Under-20 National Team.

References

External links

1993 births
Algerian footballers
Algeria youth international footballers
Gabon international footballers
Gabonese footballers
JSM Béjaïa players
Living people
Sportspeople from Boulogne-Billancourt
Valenciennes FC players
Association football defenders
21st-century Algerian people
21st-century Gabonese people
Footballers from Hauts-de-Seine